Adrienne J. Keene (born 20 October 1985) is a Native American academic, writer, and activist. A member of the Cherokee Nation, she is the founder of Native Appropriations, a blog on contemporary Indigenous issues analyzing the way that Indigenous peoples are represented in popular culture, covering issues of cultural appropriation in fashion and music and stereotyping in film and other media. She is also an assistant professor of American Studies and Ethnic Studies at Brown University, where her research focuses on educational outcomes for Native students.

Early life and education
Keene is a member of the Cherokee Nation and grew up in San Diego, California. She earned her B.A. from Stanford University in Cultural and Social Anthropology and Native American Studies in 2007. Keene then received a master's degree in education in 2010 followed by a doctorate Ed.D. in culture, communities and education in May 2014 from the Harvard Graduate School of Education. Her dissertation was titled "College Pride, Native Pride, and Education for Nation Building: Portraits of Native Students Navigating Freshman Year."

Activism
Keene's blog Native Appropriations is a webpage and forum for Native peoples, including discussions of cultural appropriation, media representations and updates on Indigenous activism. The site and Keene's writing there, as well as across other social media sites and speaking engagements, have drawn notice for commentary on topics including Native American mascots,  Dakota Access Pipeline protests, college access for Native students, cultural appropriation in children's literature, tourism in Indigenous communities, fashion and racist costumes.

Supporting Native college students has also been part of Keene's work. She belongs to College Horizons, an organization that has sponsored a series of workshops that support Native students through the different stages of the college process, from admissions to navigating college life. This work formed part of her dissertation.

Starting in 2019, along with Matika Wilbur (Swinomish/Tulalip), Keene co-hosts a podcast called "All My Relations," which investigates and delves into contemporary Native identity.

Academic scholarship
In 2014, Keene became a Presidential Postdoctoral Fellow in Brown University's Department of Anthropology and the Center for the Study of Race and Ethnicity in America. She is now Assistant Professor of American Studies and Ethnic Studies at Brown. Her research focuses on access to higher education for Native students in America, as well as Native representation in media and culture. She continues this project with research on the use of media and emerging technology platforms by Native people to combat these images.

She is affiliated with the American Studies Association, the Native American Indigenous Studies Association, the American Educational Research Association, the Eastern Sociological Society, and the National Indian Education Association.

Publications 
 Notable Native People: 50 Indigenous Leaders, Dreamers, and Changemakers from Past and Present. Ten Speed Press, 2021. ISBN 978-1-9848-5794-1.
 "College Pride, Native Pride: A Portrait of a Culturally Grounded Precollege Access Program for American Indian, Alaska Native, and Native Hawaiian Students." Harvard Educational Review, 2016.
 "Representations matter: Supporting Native students in college environments". Journal Committed to Social Change on Race and Ethnicity, 2015.

References

External links
 

1985 births
21st-century American women writers
21st-century Native Americans
21st-century Native American women
American bloggers
American women bloggers
American podcasters
Brown University faculty
Cherokee writers
Harvard Graduate School of Education alumni
Living people
Native American academics
Native American women academics
American women academics
Native American activists
Native American women writers
Stanford University alumni
Writers from San Diego
American women podcasters